"Same Boat" is a song recorded by American country music group Zac Brown Band. It was released on June 11, 2021, and released to country radio on June 14, 2021. The song was co-written by Jonathan Singleton, Ben Simonetti and Zac Brown, and produced by Brown and Simonetti. It is the lead single from their seventh studio album The Comeback. This is the band's first number one single on Country Airplay since "Beautiful Drug" in 2016, and their fourteenth overall. In September 2022, the band re-released The Comeback with a bonus remix of the song featuring guest vocals from Jimmy Buffett.

Background
Lead vocalist Brown said in a statement: "'Same Boat' is about how we all go through the same things, all together. It is a chance to be able to remind people to be positive, be good to each other and show empathy. You don't know what it's like to walk around in someone else's shoes. We're all human beings. Let's spread some love around and show kindness to each other."

Music video
The music video was released on August 6, 2021, and was directed by Spidey Smith. It was filmed in Moore Haven, Florida, and showcases individuals from all walks of life.

Charts

Weekly charts

Year-end charts

References

2021 singles
2021 songs
Zac Brown Band songs
Songs written by Zac Brown
Songs written by Jonathan Singleton
BBR Music Group singles